A cave is a natural opening in the ground stretching beyond the zone of light and large enough to permit the entry of a man. Some are found in cliffs at the edge of the coastline, chiseled away by the relentless pounding of waves and also by a variety of geological processes. Caves range from the size of a single small room to interlinked passages, miles long.

Below shows a list of some caves in Belize with known depths and lengths.

Caves

See also 
 List of caves
 Speleology

References 

 
Belize
Caves